Styloleptoides inflaticollis is a species of longhorn beetles of the subfamily Lamiinae, and the only species in the genus Styloleptoides. It was described by Chemsak in 1966.

References

Acanthocinini
Beetles described in 1966
Monotypic beetle genera